Red Light Green Light, or Statues, is a children's game.

Red Light Green Light may also refer to:

 "Red Light, Green Light" (Squid Game), a 2021 television episode
 "Red Light Green Light" (song) by DaBaby, 2021
 "Red Light Green Light", a song by Digga D, 2021
 "Red Light Green Light", a song by Duke Dumont, 2019
 "Red Light - Green Light", a song by the Wildhearts, 1996
 Redlight, Greenlight, an EP by Black Sheep, 2002